The 2002–03 Stade de Reims season was the club's 72nd season in existence and the first season back in the second division of French football since 1990. In addition to the domestic league, Reims participated in this season's edition of the Coupe de France and Coupe de la Ligue. The season covered the period from 1 July 2002 to 30 June 2003.

Reims immediately returned to the Championnat National after losing to Toulouse in the penultimate round.

Players

First-team squad

Transfers

In

Out

Pre-season and friendlies

Competitions

Overview

Ligue 2

League table

Results summary

Results by round

Matches

Coupe de France

Coupe de la Ligue

References

External links

Stade de Reims seasons
Reims